Bill or William Durkee may refer to:

 Will Durkee (born ), American professional poker player
 Wilfred "Bill" Durkee (1921–2006), American professional basketball player